John Herman George Vehslage (December 20, 1842 – July 21, 1904) was an American merchant, militia officer and politician from New York.

Life
Born in New York City, Vehslage attended the public schools. He left school to become a clerk in the retail grocery business. Later he engaged in the coal and wood business.

He joined the Third Cavalry, New York National Guard, in 1863 and was commissioned a captain by Gov. Horatio Seymour on February 15, 1864. He was appointed inspector of rifle practice with the rank of captain and continued in service until 1880, when the regiment was mustered out by order of Governor Cornell. He remained as supernumerary until November 12, 1883, when he received an honorable discharge from Gov. Grover Cleveland.

He was a member of the New York State Assembly (New York Co., 1st D.) in 1894.

Vehslage was elected as a Democrat to the 55th United States Congress, holding office from March 4, 1897 to March 3, 1899.

He died in New York City on July 21, 1904; and was buried at the Lutheran Cemetery in Brooklyn.

Sources

American people of Dutch descent
1842 births
1904 deaths
National Guard (United States) officers
Democratic Party members of the New York State Assembly
Politicians from New York City
Democratic Party members of the United States House of Representatives from New York (state)
19th-century American politicians